Richard Bower (died 1561) was Master of the Children of the Chapel Royal from 1545 to 1561, serving under four monarchs—Henry VIII, Edward VI, Mary I and Elizabeth I.

By 1524 he was singing in the chapel of Thomas Wolsey, becoming a Gentleman of the Chapel Royal by 1538.

A "tragical comedy" play, Apius and Virginia is attributed to him.

Bower was the father-in-law of Richard Farrant, and an associate of Thomas Tallis who was an overseer of his will. He was buried in St Alfege Church, Greenwich.

References

Further reading

External links
 1575 edition of Apius and Virginia at archive.org
 Apius and Virginia at WorldCat

Gentlemen of the Chapel Royal
Masters of the Children of the Chapel Royal
1561 deaths
16th-century English musicians
16th-century English dramatists and playwrights
Date of birth uncertain